Hurma can refer to:

 Hurma, Çan, village
 another name for Kalburabastı